Show Me What You're Made Of is a CBBC documentary series hosted by Stacey Dooley.  The series follows British children as they go around the world to experience some of the world's toughest jobs for themselves. Each series is filmed in a different place around the world. As of 2017, seven series have aired. The first series aired on 12 December 2011.

Development and production
A second series aired in December 2012, and a third series in December 2013 which saw a change of location from South East Asia to Brazil. Each episode sees Dooley take the children to a factory or farm to experience life as a worker. A fourth and fifth series were announced on CBBC's 'Be on a Show' website in February 2014. These took place in Africa and the UK. The sixth series returned to filming in Africa, although the final two series were shot in the UK.

The show launched careers for EastEnders actress Milly Zero, Callum Scott Howells, Michael Adams and Photographer Rhianna Thomas.

Broadcasts
The series was originally broadcast on BBC One for the first series until the BBC moved all children's programming to the dedicated CBBC Channel and CBBC HD from the second series onwards. Subsequent repeats have appeared across both channels, with the programme continuing to be shown in 2021.

Series overview

External links
 

2013 British television series debuts
BBC children's television shows
Documentary television series about industry
2010s British children's television series
Stacey Dooley
Television series by Warner Bros. Television Studios